Lucy Wood (born 22 February 1994) is an English international field hockey player who plays as a forward for England and Great Britain.

She plays club hockey in the Investec Women's Hockey League Premier Division for Buckingham Hockey Club.

She has also played for Horsham, East Grinstead, Sevenoaks, Holcombe and Slough.

She competed for England in the women's hockey tournament at the 2014 Commonwealth Games where she won a silver medal.

References

1994 births
Living people
Commonwealth Games silver medallists for England
English female field hockey players
Field hockey players at the 2014 Commonwealth Games
Commonwealth Games medallists in field hockey
Holcombe Hockey Club players
East Grinstead Hockey Club players
Women's England Hockey League players
Medallists at the 2014 Commonwealth Games